The men's hammer throw at the 2016 European Athletics Championships took place at the Olympic Stadium on 8 and 10 July.

Records

Schedule

Results

Qualification

Qualification: 75.00 m (Q) or best 12 performers (q)

Final

References

External links
 amsterdam2016.org, official championship site

Hammer Throw
Hammer throw at the European Athletics Championships